William Marchant may refer to:

 William Marchant (playwright) (1923–1995), American playwright and screenwriter
 William Sydney Marchant (1894–1953), British colonial administrator
 William Marchant (loyalist) (1948–1987), Northern Irish loyalist and volunteer in the Ulster Volunteer Force
 William Lavington Marchant (1828-1888), An Australian Pastoralist
 William Marchant (Rhode Island) (fl. 1800s), a Justice of the Rhode Island Supreme Court from 1808 to 1810